Daan Ibrahim (born 8 December 1995) is a Dutch football player of Syrian descent who plays for RKAV Volendam.

Club career
He made his professional debut in the Eerste Divisie for Almere City FC on 30 October 2015 in a game against Achilles '29.

In August 2017, Ibrahim joined Helmond Sport. In January 2020, he returned to RKAV Volendam.

References

External links
 

1995 births
People from Purmerend
Dutch people of Syrian descent
Syrian Kurdish people
Living people
Dutch footballers
Association football forwards
Almere City FC players
Helmond Sport players
Eerste Divisie players
Footballers from North Holland